Martin Heppell (born 14 November 1974) is a former Australian rules footballer who played with St Kilda and Melbourne in the Australian Football League (AFL).

Recruited from Carey Grammar, Heppell played five senior games for St Kilda over two seasons, then went to Melbourne, at pick 28 in the 1995 Pre-Season Draft. He was also unable to gain regular senior selection at Melbourne, playing only two AFL games.

Heppell was a member of Norwood's 1998 SANFL reserves premiership team.

He later coached the Box Hill reserves and Mitcham in the Eastern Football League.

Martin is now a partner/facilitator for The Resilience Project.

References

1974 births
Living people
People educated at Carey Baptist Grammar School
Australian rules footballers from Victoria (Australia)
St Kilda Football Club players
Melbourne Football Club players
Norwood Football Club players